Gleie is a surname. Notable people with the surname include:

Katrin Gleie (born 1978), Danish rower
Knud Gleie (1935–2010), Danish swimmer

Danish-language surnames